Ohio Veterans Plaza is a memorial on the east side of the Ohio Statehouse grounds, in Columbus, Ohio, United States, commemorating "Ohio men and women who have served our country since World War II, as well as those who will serve in the future". Designed by John Schooley, the plaza features a lawn flanked by two Ohio limestone walls with inscriptions written by Ohio military personnel.

See also
 List of public art in Columbus, Ohio

References

Downtown Columbus, Ohio
Limestone sculptures in the United States
Monuments and memorials in Ohio
Ohio Statehouse
Outdoor sculptures in Columbus, Ohio